Anoop Chandran is an Indian actor and comedian who appears in Malayalam films. He was a contestant in the reality show Bigg Boss Malayalam Season 1 in 2018.

Career
Mostly appeared in comic roles, he is best known for his roles in Classmates, Shakespeare M.A. Malayalam, and Rasathanthram.

Personal life

Anoop born to Ramachandra Panicker & Chandralekha Devi on 19 March 1976. He is a graduate from N.S.S. College, Cherthala. Later he pursued his studies from School of Drama in 2004. He hails from Areeparambu of Cherthala, Alappuzha district, Kerala. Anoop Chandran got engaged with Lakshmi Rajagopal on 6 June 2019.

Controversy
He was arrested for disrupting a meeting of Youth Congress at his village. According to the sources, Anoop the resident of the area interrupted the speech in a drunken state and this led to the tiff between the politicians. The actor also complained that he was manhandled by the congress workers. Later, both the complaints were withdrawn and he was released.

Filmography

Acting

Dubbing Work

Television

Awards
Asianet Comedy Awards
2016 : Best Actor (TV)

References

External links
 

Living people
Male actors in Malayalam cinema
1976 births
Bigg Boss Malayalam contestants